Kendriya Vidyalaya, Dahi Chowki Unnao (Hindi for Central School) is a system of central government schools under the Ministry of Human Resource Development India.It is located near Dahi Chowki District Unnao at a distance 25 km from Kanpur city on Lucknow -Kanpur National High Way.

History
Kendriya Vidyalaya Unnao was established in the year 1984. It is the only Kendriya Vidyalaya in District Unnao providing education up to Senior Secondary level.

Games
Indoor Games:Table Tennis, Chess.
Outdoor Games:Volley Ball,  Kho-kho, Cricket, Football

References

Kendriya Vidyalayas in Uttar Pradesh
Primary schools in Uttar Pradesh
High schools and secondary schools in Uttar Pradesh
Education in Unnao
Educational institutions established in 1984
1984 establishments in Uttar Pradesh